The 2011–12 Bobsleigh World Cup is a multi race tournament over a season for bobsleigh. The season started on 2 December 2011 in Igls, Austria and ended on 11 February 2012 in Calgary, Alberta, Canada. The World Cup is organised by the FIBT who also run World Cups and Championships in skeleton. This season is sponsored by Viessmann.

Calendar 
Below is the schedule of the 2011/12 season.

Results

Two-man

Four-man

Two-woman

Standings

Two-man

Four-man

Two-woman

See also
FIBT World Championships 2012

References

External links 
 FIBT

2011-12
World Cup
World Cup
December 2011 sports events in Europe
January 2012 sports events in Europe
January 2012 sports events in Canada
February 2012 sports events in Canada